Pectotoma is a genus of false flower beetles in the family Scraptiidae. There is one described species in Pectotoma, P. hoppingi.

References

Further reading

 
 

Scraptiidae
Articles created by Qbugbot